Craig J. Fennie is an American scientist. He is currently a professor at the School of Applied and Engineering Physics at Cornell University in Ithaca, New York. Fennie is a physicist and materials scientist. He is best known for winning a MacArthur Award in 2013.

Early life
Craig Óg grew up in working-class neighborhoods of Philadelphia (Olney and NE) and attended Archdiocese primary (Incarnation of our Lord, known as "Inky") and high school (Archbishop Ryan High School). He took nearly a decade off before going to graduate school. During this time he was in an Irish-American punk band and worked several jobs including being a bouncer.

His family came from Tír Eoghain, Tuaisceart Éireann, near Loch Neagh. His father (Craig Mór) was a steamfitter, originally from Lackawanna, NY. His mother is from Minersville PA.

Work
Fennie's work combines elements of physics and chemistry in order to invent new materials with desirable properties.

From Throwing Rocks and Punk Rock, to Designing Rocks atom-by-atom
"Throwing Rocks ..." is the title of the general audience, public talk that Craig has been giving ever since his unusual path to where he is today was revealed after being named a MacArthur Fellow. It is a play on the fact that as a kid in Olney, throwing rocks was what Craig did for fun, then as a teenager & young adult moving onto punk rock, to the fact that today he works mostly on complex oxide materials (most geological rocks are such materials).

The main message of the talk is that there are real obstacles to learning STEM fields, but these obstacles aren't what most people think. Craig discusses both external obstacles (particularly for those from backgrounds where the realities of daily life itself presents challenges to learning) and internal obstacles (not believing you can "do it"). He points out that physics/math/etc is difficult, it is supposed to be, and it is hard for everyone at first (some people are just better at hiding this fact).  He asks a question, "Why is it that no one questions the fact that to excel at sports it takes practice, practice, practice; Yet when it comes to education, students and their parents (and too many educators) have an attitude that if you "get a bad grade" in a subject you must not be good at it and you should study something else? Too often in such cases this external obstacle, this interpretation of a bad grade, conditions our internal response to the point of wanting to avoid the subject, i.e., developing a dislike of the subject, or creating the internal obstacle of not believing one can do it."

Craig's key point is that in learning a STEM field it is exactly the failures, and how we respond to them, in which we truly learn. He argues this is exactly the same as in sports. To make his point explicit,  Craig calls upon the words of skateboarding legend Rodney Mullen from his TED Talk entitled "On getting up again: Rodney Mullen at TEDxOrangeCoast",.  Craig wonders out loud how is it that a skateboarder knows better how to excel at STEM fields than most STEM educators and tells the audience that everyone needs to watch Rodney's talk.

Quoting Rodney Mullen, in skateboarding "... we fall and get back up, ... every fiber in him, tells him don't do it again ... this act of getting up again shapes us."

Craig argues that the feeling that overcomes us when we get a bad grade on a test is the same biological response as the skateboarder who fell, i.e., don't do it again, this hurts! But if we get back up and try again (and if we fail again, try again), puts one on a path towards breaking our internal obstacles to learning STEM. Quoting Rodney, "... the biggest obstacle to creativity is breaking through the barriers of disbelief."

References

21st-century American physicists
MacArthur Fellows
Fellows of the American Physical Society
Cornell University College of Engineering faculty
American materials scientists
Villanova University alumni
Living people
Year of birth missing (living people)